Thomas Vaske is an East German sprint canoer who competed in the late 1980s. He won three medals at the ICF Canoe Sprint World Championships with a silver (K-4 1000 m: 1986) and two bronzes (K-2 1000 m: 1987, K-4 1000 m: 1989).

References

German male canoeists
Living people
Year of birth missing (living people)
ICF Canoe Sprint World Championships medalists in kayak